Hans Hinrich Wendt (June 18, 1853 in Hamburg – January 19, 1928 in Jena) was a German Protestant theologian.

Life
After studying theology at Leipzig, Göttingen and Tübingen, he became in 1885 professor ordinarius of systematic theology at Heidelberg, and in 1893 was called to Jena. His work on the teaching of Jesus (Die Lehre Jesu, 1886-1890; English translation of second part, 1892) made him widely known. He also edited several editions (5th to 8th, 1880-1898) of the Commentary on the Acts of the Apostles in Heinrich August Wilhelm Meyer's series. In May 1904 he delivered two addresses in London on The Idea and Reality of Revelation, and Typical Forms of Christianity, as the Essex Hall Lectures (published, 1904).

Additional works 
 Die christliche Lehre von der menschlichen Vollkommenheit (1882).
 Der Erfahrungsbeweis für die Wahrheit des Christentums (1897).
 Das Johannesevangelium (1900; English translation, 1902).

References

External links
 

1853 births
1928 deaths
Academic staff of Heidelberg University
Academic staff of the University of Jena
Writers from Hamburg
19th-century German Protestant theologians
20th-century German Protestant theologians
19th-century German male writers
German male non-fiction writers